Virgin Sun Airlines, branded as Virgin Sun, was a British charter airline owned by the Virgin Group, formed in 1998. The airline's main destinations were the Mediterranean and the Canary Islands. Virgin Sun's main bases were Manchester Airport and London Gatwick Airport.

History

Virgin Sun was created as a charter airline in May 1999, operating from Gatwick Airport and Manchester Airport Terminal 2, leasing two Airbus A320-200 aircraft. After a successful launch and first summer season, Virgin Sun then received a third A320-200 and its first and only Airbus A321-200 the following year.

The airline was known for its ground breaking approach to inflight service being the first UK charter airline to ditch the traditional style meal for something more 'fun' in its first year of operation.  After boarding all guests were offered a can of SeaBreeze cocktail (or a non-alcoholic version). After take off, Outbound guests were served with a meal of a bacon / veggie sausage sandwich on breakfast flights or hot dog / veggie sausage dog and potato wedges — prepared individually by the cabin crew with onions / sauces and an individual slice of chocolate gateau as a dessert.  Inbound the meal was a jacket potato with a choice of 3 toppings and again a gateau dessert. Tea and coffee was served in coffee shop style disposable cups with the option of a 'squirty cream' topping. Downroute, customers were offered an ice lolly as they boarded.

In April 2001, two years after the airline commenced operations, Virgin Holidays decided to cease the operations of Virgin Sun, due to failing to make the expected profits. After a buyer was sought for the airline, it was eventually sold to Air 2000 which became First Choice Airways and subsequently merged with Thomsonfly. Virgin Sun ceased operations on 1 November 2001.

Two of the Airbus A320-200s were put into storage in Bristol, and the Airbus A321-200 (G-VKIS) and one of the Airbus A320-200s (G-VMED) were returned to the lessor, GECAS. One of the Airbus A320-200s (G-VKID) was sold on 21 June 2002 to the low-cost Swedish airline Goodjet, which is now defunct. The other Airbus A320-200 (G-VTAN) was eventually sold to Virgin Atlantic on 22 June 2004.

Destinations

Fleet
The Virgin Sun fleet consisted of the following aircraft:

In popular culture
The airline featured prominently in the 2000 film Kevin and Perry Go Large. One of Virgin Sun's Airbus A320-200 aircraft (G-VMED) was seen landing at Alicante–Elche Miguel Hernández Airport doubling as Ibiza Airport.

References

External links

 Archive of Virgin Holidays website

Defunct airlines of the United Kingdom
Airlines established in 1998
Airlines disestablished in 2001
S